Terra Natura are two zoo theme parks and aqua parks (Aqua Natura) located near Benidorm (Terra natura Benidorm) and Murcia (Terra Natura Murcia), in the Costa Blanca, Spain.

Terra Natura Animal Parks lets visitors make contact with animals with barriers invisible to the human eye. Many species can be viewed, including elephants, tigers, monkeys, lions, African buffalo, and rhinos.

Terra Natura Benidorm

The  of Terra Natura Benidorm are divided into four zones or areas: Pangea (the park entrance area), America, Asia and Europe. Between the areas  visitors can see about 1500 animals representing 200 species.

Aqua Natura Benidorm

Terra Natura Murcia

The  of Terra Natura Murcia are divided into two zones or areas: African Savannah and the Iberian Peninsula. Between the two areas there are about 300 animals representing 50 species.

Aqua Natura Murcia

Aqua Natura Murcia is a  water park with an aquarium, and attempts to recreate the Zanzibar archipelago in the Pacific.

References 
All the following links are leading to the error message: The resource cannot be found.               Description: HTTP 404. The resource you are looking for (or one of its dependencies) could have been removed, had its name changed, or is temporarily unavailable.  Please review the following URL and make sure that it is spelled correctly.

Requested URL: /Eng/TerranaturaBenidorm/Ficha3.aspx

correction requested

~ganga

External links 
 

Zoos in Spain
Tourist attractions in the Valencian Community
Buildings and structures in the Valencian Community